The Big North Conference (BNC) is a high school conference based in northern Michigan, and is affiliated with the Michigan High School Athletic Association (MHSAA).  Created in 1997 after the split of Traverse City High School into Central and West High School.  It combined the eight largest schools in Northern Michigan.  In 2004, due to decreasing enrollment Cheboygan and Sault Area left the conference.  They were replaced in 2011 with West Branch Ogemaw Heights, but they left the conference after the 2015-16 school year due to decreasing enrollment as well.

In 2021, the league announced the departure of Traverse City Central and Traverse City West high schools' football programs, and those schools becoming associate members of the Saginaw Valley League. However, other sports offered by those schools will continue to participate in the Big North Conference.

Member schools

Former schools

Membership timeline

Football champions
From 1997 to 1999 the Big North had a A division and a B division.

Since 2000, the conference has operated with one division.

Teams in the Final Regular Season Rankings

Conference Records

State Championship Results

Boys Basketball Champions

Conference Records

Girls Basketball Champions

Conference Records

References

Michigan high school sports conferences
High school sports conferences and leagues in the United States
Traverse City Central-Traverse City West Rivalry
Sports in Traverse City, Michigan